His Name Is Nobody is a 1979 Hong Kong martial arts comedy film, written and directed by Karl Maka and starring Lau Kar-wing, Dean Shek and Bryan Leung.

Plot
The Nobody Kid (Lau Kar-wing) is a street urchin who was abandoned as a child and does not have a name.  One day, he meets Sting (Dean Shek), a master con artist, who takes Nobody as his disciple and teaches him swindling and martial arts skills.  The duo is later enlisted by Sting's brother, Baldy (Karl Maka), to murder Ping the Dreg (Chung Fat), a professional assassin.  Sting and Nobody plan to take advantage of Ping's lust for woman and use Baldy's wife to seduce Ping.  However, their plan fails and Ping kills Baldy's wife, while Sting and Nobody are separated as well.  While alone, Nobody meets Koo the Iron Heart (Bryan Leung), an elderly martial arts master and Ping's rival, who also takes Nobody as his disciple and teaches him his skills.  However, Koo is later killed by Ping.  Nobody eventually reunites with Sting, and together, they confront Ping for vengeance.

Cast
Lau Kar-wing as The Nobody Kid
Dean Shek as Sting
Bryan Leung as Koo the Iron Heart
Chung Fat as Ping the Dreg
Karl Maka as Baldy
Chiu Chi-ling as Kung fu master
Addy Sung
Yau Poi-ling
To Siu-ming as Man in restaurant (cameo)
Lam Ching-ying as Man wearing black wig
Mars as Man in restaurant (cameo)
Ho Pak-kwong as Man with bird cage
Tai San as Lost son
Tsang Cho-lam as Fee collector for bridge passo
Yue Tau-wan (cameo)
Billy Chan as Killer with long white hair
Pan Yung-sheng
Meg Lam as Baldy's wife
Chung Hei as Father of lost son
Johnny Cheung
Yuen Miu
Cheung Chok-chow as Ping's agent
To Wai-wo
Lo Wai
Guy Lai
Ho Wan
Lung Ying
Ho Bo-sing

Critical reception
Andrew Saroch of Far East Films gave the film a score of three out of five stars and describes the film as "a diverting production that manages to challenge a few clichés of the genre" and praises Dean Shek's performance as "endearing".

References

External links

His Name Is Nobody at Hong Kong Cinemagic

1979 films
1979 martial arts films
1970s action comedy films
Hong Kong action comedy films
Hong Kong martial arts comedy films
Kung fu films
Hong Kong slapstick comedy films
1970s Cantonese-language films
Films about con artists
Films about orphans
1979 comedy films
1970s Hong Kong films